Asplundia cuspidata is a species of plant in the Cyclanthaceae family. It is endemic to Ecuador.  Its natural habitat is subtropical or tropical moist montane forests.

References

cuspidata
Endemic flora of Ecuador
Vulnerable flora of South America
Taxonomy articles created by Polbot